University is a census-designated place (CDP) and the official name for an area covering a portion of the University of Mississippi (Ole Miss) campus, in Lafayette County, Mississippi, United States. The CDP is surrounded by the city of Oxford. Its official United States Postal Service designation is "University, Mississippi", with a ZIP Code of 38677.

The population at the 2010 census was 4,202, while the 2014 enrollment for Ole Miss was 20,112 in 2014.

The University CDP is an enclave surrounded by the city of Oxford, west of its downtown area.

Demographics

Education
The CDP is in the Oxford School District. The district operates Oxford High School.

Climate

According to the Köppen Climate Classification system, University has a humid subtropical climate, abbreviated "Cfa" on climate maps.

References

University of Mississippi
Census-designated places in Lafayette County, Mississippi
Census-designated places in Mississippi